Al Rayyan (also spelled as Ar Rayyan) is the third-largest municipality in the state of Qatar. Its primary settlement is the city of the same name, which occupies the entire eastern section and largely surrounds Metropolitan Doha and functions as a suburb. The vast expanse of mostly undeveloped lands in the south-west also falls under the municipality's administration.

Etymology

Similar to many other names given to Qatari settlements and municipalities, Al Rayyan Municipality was named after a geographic feature present in its namesake, the city of Al Rayyan. The city derives its name from the Arabic term "ray", which translates to "irrigation". This name was bestowed upon it due to its low elevation, allowing it to act as a flood plain and provide a sustained supply of water to the numerous plants that grew within its boundaries.

History
In March 1893, the Battle of Al Wajbah was fought between the Qataris and Ottomans at the recently built Al Wajbah Fort, located 10 miles west of Old Doha. Although Qatar did not gain full independence from the Ottoman Empire, the result of the battle is seen by Qataris as a defining moment in the establishment of Qatar as a modern state.

Al Rayyan Municipality was created as an independent municipal administration by the Ministry of Municipality and Urban Planning in 1972.

Since 2004, Al Jemailiya Municipality was merged with Al Rayyan, and Jariyan Al Batnah Municipality was split between Al Rayyan and Al Wakrah Municipality. Doha Industrial Area, also known as Zone 58, was split off from Al Rayyan and integrated into Doha Municipality, becoming an exclave of Doha.

In 2014, the western city of Al-Shahaniya was dissociated from Al Rayyan Municipality to form its own municipality. Integrating approximately 35% of Al Rayyan's area into the new municipality, some of Al Rayyan's western localities such as Al Gharbiam, Al Utouriya, Al Jemailiya, Umm Bab, Rawdat Rashed, Al Nasraniya, Dukhan and Al Khurayb were also included in the new municipality.

Geography

Al Rayyan is bordered by four municipalities: Umm Salal to the northeast, Al-Shahaniya to the west, Doha to the east and Al Wakrah to the southeast. It is divided into two main sections; the west consisting of scattered rural settlements, farms and open desert, and the east comprising the city of Al Rayyan, an urban offshoot of Metropolitan Doha's westward growth.

According to the Ministry of Municipality and Environment (MME), the municipality accommodates 223 rawdas, 38 wadis, 24 jeris (places where water flows), six plains, six sabkhas, six capes, and six bays. No islands exist off its coasts. The MME recorded 50 hills, one of the most notable being Jebel Nakhsh, which stands 90 meters tall. Furthermore, there is one highland in the municipality, called Alaa Jaow Al Mathlouth Al Janoubi which consists of elevated surface south of an elongated depression and its namesake, Jaow Al Mathlouth.

Al Gharrafa, which is a district of Al Rayyan City and also a part of metropolitan Doha, is being developed as a large-scale commercial hub for residents of northwest Doha, northern Al Rayyan and southern Umm Salal. The district is already a well-established retail center, hosting many major malls and supermarkets. A small amount of residential developments are also planned for the district.

Administration

The municipality is divided into 10 zones which are then divided into 1410 blocks. As of 2017, Rashid Hamad Al-Hajri is the mayor of Al Rayyan Municipality.

Administrative zones
The following administrative zones are found in Al Rayyan Municipality as of 2015:

Districts
Other settlements in Al Rayyan include:

Al Aamriya
Al Hemaila
Al Khaldiya
Al Mukaynis
Al Rekayya
Baida Al Gaa
Eglat Faisal
Jaww Basheer
Jariyan Al Batnah
Lusail West
Rawdat Al Jahhaniya
Ummahat Owaina
Umm Al Afaei
Umm Al Suwab
Umm Hawta

Economy

Due to Al Rayyan's lack of a coastline in its population centers in the eastern section, fishing and pearling did not play a part in building its economy; this is in sharp contrast to Qatar's other urban centers which were largely dependent on maritime activities. Instead, nomadic herding of livestock and small-scale crop cultivation comprised the livelihoods of its past inhabitants.

According to government statistics recorded when Al-Shahaniya was still integrated into Al Rayyan, the municipality accounted for the majority of Qatar's farming activities. In 2015, 36% of Qatar's total farmland was based in Al Rayyan, putting it just ahead of Al Khor with 35% of the country's farmland. There were 499 farms occupying 17,136 hectares, most of which (256) were involved in cultivating crops, 234 of which were mixed operations, 8 of which raised livestock, and 1 categorized as "other". The municipality had a livestock inventory of 108,508, including 52,582 sheep and 27,380 goats. Livestock numbers were surpassed only by Al Khor.

Until 2017, Muaither Yard was the only farmers' market in the municipality. Qatar Foundation established Torba Farmers' Market in Education City in November 2017. Only organically grown produce is sold at this market.

Education
According to the 2015 census conducted by the Ministry of Municipality and Environment, there were a total of 199 schools located in Al Rayyan at that time. State schools were recorded as amounting to 108 in the 2016 education census – 50 were exclusively for girls and 58 were for boys. A slightly higher number of students were male, at 23,558 compared to 23,455 female students.

Several schools have transferred to Al Rayyan from Doha as a result of lower operating costs and closer proximity to students.

Various universities main campuses in Education City, a city-scale project by Qatar Foundation which is spread across the Al Gharrafa, Gharrafat Al Rayyan and Al Shagub districts of Al Rayyan City. Among the universities are:
Carnegie Mellon University in Qatar
Georgetown University in Qatar
Hamad Bin Khalifa University
Northwestern University in Qatar
Texas A&M University at Qatar
Virginia Commonwealth University - Qatar
Weill Cornell Medical College in Qatar

Healthcare

Healthcare standards in the municipality have been boosted by Sidra Medical and Research Center, which is in the Al Gharrafa district of Al Rayyan. Its initial inpatient hospital was formally opened in January 2018 with 400 beds. At peak operational capacity, it will serve more than 275,000 patients per year. Biomedical research is also conducted at Sidra, with its research facilities becoming operational in 2015.

Aspetar, a specialised orthopaedic and sports medicine hospital, is found in the Aspire Zone in the Baaya district. Commencing operations in 2007, it was the first-ever sports medicine hospital in the Middle East region. It earned accreditation as a FIFA Medical Centre of Excellence in 2009.

Overall, there were twenty-six health care facilities recorded by the 2015 government census. Sixty-four pharmacies were recorded in the municipality in 2013 by Qatar's Supreme Council of Health.

Transportation

Public transport

Public transport in the municipality is generally poor and not used by most of its residents due to a lack of facilities at the central station and inconsistent headway.

Metro
Doha Metro's Green Line, also called the Education Line, passes through Al Rayyan. There are metro stations in Al Shagub, Education City and Qatar National Library, and Old Al Rayyan. The line was opened to the public on 10 December 2019.

Roads

Salwa Road
Salwa Road runs from Doha proper to Abu Samra on the Qatar-Saudi border for roughly 95 km. For the most part, the road passes solely through Al Rayyan Municipality, but there is a stretch of highway that serves as the dividing line between Al Rayyan Municipality and Al-Shahaniya Municipality. It is an important commercial artery in the municipality's eastern extremity, hosting car showrooms, superstores and outlet stores. Moreover, many rural areas to the south-west of Metropolitan Doha are connected to the highway network through Salwa Road. It runs through the following districts in Al Rayyan, sorted from east to west and north to south:

Fereej Al Soudan
Al Mamoura
Al Waab
Abu Hamour
Ain Khaled
Al Aziziya
New Fereej Al Ghanim
Fereej Al Murra
Bu Sidra
Industrial Area
Al Sailiya
Mebaireek
Abu Nakhla
Al Khaldiya
Ummahat Owaina
Al Mukaynis
Markhiyat Al Darb
Umm Al Suwab
Al Karaana
Lusail West
Dohat Salwa
Abu Samra

Dukhan Highway
Westward travel towards Dukhan and Al-Shahaniya is facilitated by the roughly 66 km-long Dukhan Highway. The road spans from Bani Hajer in the east to Dukhan in the west. It runs through the following districts in Al Rayyan, sorted from east to west and north to south:
Bani Hajer
Al Wajbah
Al Seej
Rawdat Al Jahhaniya
Umm Al Afaei
Umm Leghab

Orbital Highway
The Orbital Highway is Qatar's longest road at 195 km. Created to bypass the traffic congestion in Doha, the highway begins in Mesaieed and ends in the north at Ras Laffan. The most important highway junctions for Al Rayyan is the Orbital Highway/Salwa Road junction and Orbital Highway/Dukhan Highway junction.

Infrastructure

Government infrastructure
On 9 December 2015, the Ministry of Municipality and Environment inaugurated a government services complex in Al Rayyan City. Four days later, the Ministry of Economy and Commerce established a branch at the services complex. Later in May 2016 another government services complex was created in Mesaimeer. Almost all government ministries are represented at the complex.

In the south-west, Abu Samra accommodates Qatar's sole border crossing with Saudi Arabia. The Ministry of Interior maintains an Immigration Department office and Customs Department office near the border crossing. On 5 June 2017, when a quartet composed of Saudi Arabia, the United Arab Emirates, Bahrain and Egypt severed ties with Qatar, the border crossing was shut down.

Worker accommodation
Municipal estimates put the number of residential units for workers at 173,550 for 2017. A massive labor camp in the Umm Al Afaei district with a capacity for 21,000 workers was announced in 2013. The project was reported to cost QAR 122 million.

Landmarks and historic sites 

There are a number of historic forts in the municipality, most of which are located within Al Rayyan City. One such fort is Al Wajbah Fort, which was the setting of a battle between the Ottomans and Qataris in the Battle of Al Wajbah in 1892.

Education City, which houses most of Qatar's universities, is spread throughout the Al Gharrafa, Gharrafat Al Rayyan and Al Shagub districts of Al Rayyan City, as is several of Qatar Foundation's institutes such as the Qatar Science & Technology Park and Qatar National Convention Centre.

Several multi-sports clubs are based in the municipality: Al Rayyan SC, Al-Gharafa SC, Muaither SC, Mesaimeer SC and Al Sailiya SC. All of these fall within the boundaries of Al Rayyan City.

Al Rayyan hosts a racing and equestrian club. Aspire Tower and Aspire Park are also nestled in the municipality, specifically on Al Waab Street in Baaya, a district of Al Rayyan City. A large-scale Venetian style mall known as Villaggio Mall is also located in the Baaya district. Doha Zoo is found nearby to these attractions in Al Aziziya. According to the Ministry of Municipality and Environment, the municipality accommodates 20 parks as of 2018.

Demographics

Note: 2010 adjusted figures here, 2015 preliminary figures

Al Rayyan's workforce is relatively diversified compared to the other municipalities. It was reported that in 2010, construction accounted for the largest sector of the workforce at 74,00, with manufacturing coming second at 15,500, followed by transportation and storage (7,900) and education (7,800). Many employed residents work outside the municipality, in Doha.

The following table is a breakdown of registered live births by nationality and sex for Al Rayyan. Places of birth are based on the home municipality of the mother at birth.

References

 
Municipalities of Qatar
Burial sites of the House of Thani